The LGV Montpellier–Perpignan is a proposed high-speed rail line between the French cities of Montpellier and Perpignan, at which points they will link with the Contournement Nîmes – Montpellier and LGV Perpignan–Figueres.  Two new stations would be constructed as part of the project in Béziers and Narbonne. Montpellier–Béziers and Rivesaltes–Toulouges will be for mixed traffic (freight and passenger), with Béziers–Toulouges being for passenger traffic only.

Route
Shortly after Montpellier-Sud de France station, trains will meet the LGV Montpellier–Perpignan near Maurin.

A parkway station serving Béziers near the A9 and A75 junction is planned.  There will also be a classic line allowing trains to call at Béziers station, from which trains can then continue to destinations such as Narbonne and Carcassonne before the Béziers-Perpignan section is complete, through trains in the direction of Perpignan will need to use the parkway station, as there is no link on the other side of Béziers.

The urban centre of Narbonne will be bypassed, but a station will be constructed to the west of the urban centre.  This station will be built over the classic line, allowing platform transfers to the line to Carcassonne, as is the case at Valence TGV station.  There will also be a triangle junction to the north of this station allowing the line to link with the line to Carcassonne without passing through the urban centre.

The planned line will offer bypasses of all the cities, with link railways to enable connections with existing stations at various points.  Passive provision has been made for a connection with the existing LGV Perpignan-Figueres line near Toulouges.

Ultimately, the goal is to allow the connection Paris–Madrid in six hours by 2025, with stops in Nîmes, Montpellier, Béziers, Narbonne, Perpignan and Barcelona. The journey time would be less competitive with the plane on the complete route, but could be rather on intermediate routes, such as Lyon–Madrid or Paris–Barcelona.

Progress
In February 2016 the preliminary high-speed route and station locations were approved by the French transport ministry . In autumn 2018, timescales were announced, namely 10 years to construct the Montpellier-Béziers section and another 10 years to construct the Béziers-Perpignan section.

On 22 January 2022 a memorandum of understanding for the financing of the line was signed. Under this agreement the Occitanie region and ten other local authorities pay 40% of the € 2 billion cost. The national government contributes the other 40% and the European Commission 20%. After this agreement a public inquiry process will be started. The agreement for the start of preliminary work on the first section is expected to be given on 27 July 2023. This first section runs for 52.3 km from Montpellier to Béziers. The expected start of construction was pushed back further, with construction on the first section to begin by early 2030. The first section is expected to be operational around 2034. The construction of the second section would follow around 2040. The second section covers the remainder of the route and is 97.7 km long.

References

Proposed railway lines in France
High-speed railway lines in France
Railway lines in Occitania (administrative region)
Transport in Montpellier
Perpignan